Asadabad (also Romanized as Asadābād; also known as Azadabad) is a village in Howmeh Rural District, in the Central District of Abhar County, Zanjan Province, Iran. At the 2006 census, its population was 90, in 21 families.

References 

Populated places in Abhar County